Mycena discobasis is a species of agaric fungus in the family Mycenaceae.  Found in South America and Madagascar, the fruit bodies of the fungus are bioluminescent.

See also 
List of bioluminescent fungi

References

External links 

discobasis
Bioluminescent fungi
Fungi described in 1949
Fungi of Madagascar
Fungi of South America